Guillermo "Memo" Gonzalez (born January 4, 1986 in Paramount, California) is an American soccer player, currently without a team.

Career

Professional
Gonzalez was member of the IMG Academy in Bradenton, Florida in 2003 (the same class as Eddie Gaven and Freddy Adu), and became one of the youngest players in MLS history when Los Angeles Galaxy drafted him as a Project-40 player with the eighth overall pick of the 2003 MLS SuperDraft at the age of 16.

Guillermo spent most of his first year in the professional ranks playing with the United States U-17 national team, and played at the Under-17 World Championship in Finland.

In his four years in Major League Soccer, Gonzalez did not see much playing time due to his youth team commitments, a cluttered Galaxy midfield, and his own lackluster performances in his limited appearances. During his first two seasons in MLS he played 12 games, but played none at all during his third and fourth seasons. He was waived by the Galaxy during the 2007 pre-season.

Coaching
Since his release from the Galaxy, Gonzalez has been unable to catch on with another team, and has begun working as a youth coach. He worked for a period at Immaculate Heart High School in Los Feliz, California, and is currently an assistant coach at Cerritos College. He is also a head varsity coach at Bishop Amat Memorial High School in La Puente, California.

References

1986 births
Living people
American soccer players
LA Galaxy players
Parade High School All-Americans (boys' soccer)
Sportspeople from Los Angeles County, California
Major League Soccer players
United States men's youth international soccer players
LA Galaxy draft picks
Soccer players from California
Association football midfielders